Rabbi Shlomo Zev Zweigenhaft was a Rosh Hashochtim of Poland (overseeing the country's kosher slaughterers) before the Holocaust. After the Holocaust he was Chief Rabbi of Hanover and Lower Saxony. Later, after emigrating to the United States he was a Rav Hamachshir (kosher certifier) and was world-renowned for his expertise in all matters related to shechita. He was described as the "foremost authority on shechita" (kosher slaughter).

Early life

Ancestry
Rabbi Zweigenhaft was born in Sosnowiec Poland in 1915. Rabbi Zweigenhaft's mother, Michla, was the daughter of Rabbi Meir Dovid Reinhertz, who was a son of the Rabbi of Yanov and a grandson of the Rabbi of Przedbórz. Rabbi Zweigenhaft's father, Rabbi Moshe Chaim, was a shochet and a student of the Avnei Nezer. At the age of two, Rabbi Zweigenhaft became an orphan and was raised by his paternal grandfather, Rabbi Efraim Mordechai Mottel Zweigenhaft who was shochet and dayin in Sosnowiec and a descendant of the Ta"z and the Ba"ch.

Education
Rabbi Zweigenhaft studied at a Radomsker cheder in Sosnowiec until the age of 12. For the next two years, he was a student of Rabbi Dov Berish Einhorn in Amstov. At the age of 14 he had memorized the gemara of the entire massekhtot of zevachim and menachot with the commentaries of Rashi and Tosafot. He then returned to Sosnowiec where he was a student of Rabbi David Moshe Rabinowicz in the exclusive Kibbutz Govoha Yeshiva.

Rabbinical Ordination
When Rabbi Zweigenhaft was 16 years old, he began to study privately with Rabbi Aryeh Tzvi Frumer.Two years later, Zweigenhaft received rabbinical ordination from Rabbi Frumer-—an extremely rare achievement, considering that Rabbi Frumer only ordained a total of 5 out of several hundred students over the course of his life.

Rosh Hashochtim of Poland
Rabbi Zweigenhaft was the scion of a family of shochtim. His father, grandfather and great-grandfather were shochtim. As a young boy Rabbi Zweigenhaft had been privy to his family's masorah (transmission of Jewish religious tradition) of shechita stretching back hundreds of years. When Rabbi Zweigenhaft was 14 years old and still studying in Amstov, the shochtim of the city encountered a halachic difficulty and summoned Rabbi Dov Berish Einhorn for assistance. Rabbi Einhorn asked Rabbi Zweigenhaft to accompany him on his walk to the slaughterhouse. When they arrived, Einhorn began to contemplate the problem that the shochtim presented to him. Rabbi Zweigenhaft then proceeded to deftly pick up the chalef and demonstrated how to perform the shechitah and resolved their issue. Rabbi Einhorn was so impressed that from then on he would only consider meat to be kosher if it was slaughtered by Rabbi Zweigenhaft despite his youth. Shortly thereafter, Rabbi Einhorn proudly told Rabbi Yitzchok Mordechai Rabinowicz (Chief Rabbi of Polavno) about Rabbi Zweigenhaft. Rabbi Rabinowicz requested that Rabbi Einhorn send Rabbi Zweigenhaft to him and then proceeded to teach Rabbi Zweigenhaft the masorah of shechita that he had learned from his grandfather the Tiferes Shlomo of Radomsk. Thereafter, the Radomsker Rebbe would only eat meat from Rabbi Zweigenhaft's Shechita. Year later, when the Minchas Elazar of Munkach visited Sosnowiec, he too would only eat from Rabbi Zweigenhaft's shechitah.

By the time he was 20, he was the shochet of many cities in Poland, including, Radomsk, Polavno, Amstov, Volbrum, Elkish, Tchebin and was the Rosh Hashochtim of the large Jewish community of Sosnowiec.

In the mid-1930s Rabbi Zweigenhaft was appointed one of the seven members of the Vaad Roshei Hashochtim of Poland and Lithuania. As the youngest of the seven Roshei Hashochtim of Poland and Lithuania, Rabbi Zweigenhaft was tasked with overseeing thousands of shochtim throughout Poland. In 1936, a bill outlawing Shechitah was introduced in the Sejm. Rabbi Zweigenhaft was selected to demonstrate to members of the Sejm that Shechita was, in fact, a quick humane form of animal slaughter. The members of the Sejm gathered in a nearby courtyard and Rabbi Zweigenhaft demonstrated actual shechita for them. This demonstration together with an intense lobbying effort was partially successful and instead of banning shechita completely the Sejm allowed the practice to continue although they restricted it with a maximum quota.

Rabbi Zweigenhaft was appointed to be the head of the Vaad

Leadership Roles In Germany

Rosh Hashochtim of British Occupation Zone of Germany
Rabbi Zweigenhaft survived the Holocaust and was liberated in Bergen Belsen on April 11, 1945. Ultimately, Rabbi Zweigenhaft retrieved a chalef from a museum in Hamburg and on August 21, 1945, performed the first shechitah on German soil since it was outlawed by the Nazis in 1933. Thereafter, the British Chief Rabbi's Religious Emergency Council appointed Rabbi Zweigenhaft to be the Rosh Hashochtim of the British Zone of Germany.

Rav Hamachshir of Bergen-Belsen
On November 7, 1945, the British Chief Rabbi's Religious Emergency Council established two massive kitchens in Celle to provide kosher food for the thousands of Jewish survivors living in the nearby Bergen-Belsen D.P. Camp and appointed Rabbi Zweigenhaft to be the Rav Hamachshir of Bergen-Belsen.

Vaad Harabonim of The British Zone and Rabbi of Various Communities
Rabbi Zweigenhaft was appointed to be one of the member Rabbis of the Vaad Harabonim of The British Zone, which was established and led by Rabbi Yoel Halpern. Since Rabbi Zweigenhaft was constantly traveling to oversee and make arrangements related to shechita, he was tasked by the Vaad to serve as the Rabbi numerous smaller Jewish communities in the British Zone that did not have their own Rabbi.

Chief Rabbi of Hannover and Lower Saxony
In the months after the liberation of Bergen Belsen, Jewish survivors slowly began to leave the D.P. Camp and settle in numerous towns and cities throughout the British Zone. When the fledgling community of Jewish survivors in Hannover became large enough to warrant its own Rabbi, Rabbi Zweigenhaft recommended to the British Chief Rabbi's Religious Emergency Council that they should appoint his friend (and future brother-in-law), Rabbi Chaim Pinchas Lubinsky to the position. In January 1946, Rabbi Lubinsky was appointed Chief Rabbi of Hannover. The community continued to grow and additional Rabbinic leadership was required. On a few rare occasions, the Vaad Harabonim of The British Zone convened a Bais Din under the leadership of Rabbi Yoel Halpern, in Hannover, consisting of various members of the Vaad including, Rabbi Lubinsky and Rabbi Yisroel Moshe Olewski (Chief Rabbi of Celle) and Rabbi Zweigenhaft. However, a more permanent solution was required and the community turned to Rabbi Zweigenhaft to be the second Rabbi of their city.

In 1949, the British occupation of North-West Germany ended and the British Chief Rabbi's Religious Emergency Council and it's appointees were required to wrap up their operations in Germany. The newly independent Jewish community in Hannover then selected Rabbi Zweigenhaft as the only Rabbi of their city. Thereafter, many smaller Jewish communities throughout Lower Saxony appointed Rabbi Zweigenhaft as their Rabbi as well and he became Chief Rabbi of Hannover and Lower Saxony.

Leader of Agudas Yisroel of the British Zone

Rabbi Zweigenhaft together with Rabbi Yirsoel Moshe Olewski and Efraim Londoner were the leaders of Agudas Yisroel of the British Zone. Rabbi Zweigenhaft very much engaged in advocating for both the spiritual and physical needs to the Jews in the zone. In 1947, Rabbi Zweigenhaft provided necessary supplies to the former passengers of the Exodus in Hamburg before they were forced to disembark.

Rav Hamachshir in America
In 1952 Rabbi Zweigenhaft emigrated to America and was invited by Rabbi Eliezer Silver to serve as the Rosh Hashochtim of the two Kosher slaughtering houses in Cincinnati, Ohio. In 1953 Rabbi Zweigenhaft moved to New York where he was shocked by the low kashrus standards of shechita and he began to advocate for improvements. In time, Rabbi Zweigenhaft became the Rav Hamachshir of several kosher slaughterhouses. As Rav Hamachsir, he was very selective in the shochtim he hired and he trained them extensively. Rabbi Zweigenhaft also instituted many reforms previously unheard of in America. Meat certified as kosher by Rabbi Zweigenhaft was considered the gold standard of kashrus and many rabbis wouldn't eat meat unless it was certified by him. Over the years, many of Rabbi Zweigenhaft's reforms took root in the industry and led to the overall improvement of shechita in America.

The Orthodox Union certifies certain species of quail as kosher based upon the masorah of Rabbi Zweigenhaft.

World-renowned Authority on Shechita
Rabbi Zweigenhaft was world-renowned as an authority on all matters related to shechita. His expertise was highly sought after and he was constantly requested to travel all over the world to lecture on shechita and inspect kosher slaughterhouses and make recommendations for improvements. Over the years Rabbi Zweigenhaft taught and trained hundreds of shochtim who carry on his legacy.

Death
Rabbi Zweigenhaft died in New York City August 2, 2005, and was buried the next day on the Mount of Olives in Jerusalem.

Family
When Rabbi Zweigenhaft was 18 years old, he married his cousin Rebbetzin Esther, the daughter of Rabbi Shlomo Sztencl. They had two children, but Esther and the two children were murdered in Auschwitz on August 2, 1943.

After surviving the Holocaust Rabbi Zweigenhaft married Rebbetzin Frieda (the daughter of Rabbi Chiel-Meyer Lubinsky) who, at the time, was a teacher of Judaic studies at the religious girls seminary (kibbutz) in Bergen-Belsen. Rebbetzin Frieda Zweigenhaft volunteered regularly at the Jewish Chronic Disease Hospital and she was one of the founders of "Rivkah Laufer Bikur Cholim", a board member of "N’shei Agudas Yisroel" chapter in Crown Heights and the vice president of "Rabbi Meir Baal Hanes Kupath Polin" Ladies Auxiliary of Brooklyn. They were survived by two children:

References

Polish Hasidic rabbis
20th-century German rabbis
People from Sosnowiec
20th-century Polish rabbis
Mittelbau-Dora concentration camp survivors
Bergen-Belsen concentration camp survivors
Gross-Rosen concentration camp survivors
1915 births
2005 deaths
American Orthodox rabbis
American Hasidic rabbis
Rabbis from Cincinnati
Rabbis from New York (state)
Hasidic rabbis in Europe
German Hasidic rabbis
People from Borough Park, Brooklyn
People with acquired American citizenship
20th-century American rabbis
Clergy from Hanover
Burials at the Jewish cemetery on the Mount of Olives